Majdan Sopocki Drugi is a village in the administrative district of Gmina Susiec, within Tomaszów Lubelski County, Lublin Voivodeship, in eastern Poland.

The village has a population of 712.

References

Majdan Sopocki Drugi